Hemiculter songhongensis is a species of Cyprinid fish in the genus Hemiculter.

References 

 

Hemiculter
Fish described in 2001